Fixem is a commune in the Moselle department in Grand Est in north-eastern France.

Was named Fuckinsheim in the year 781

See also
 Communes of the Moselle department

References

External links
 

Communes of Moselle (department)